Mats Wallberg (born February 21, 1949 in Gunnarskog) is a former ice speed skater from Sweden, who represented his native country in two consecutive Winter Olympics, starting in 1972 in Sapporo, Japan.

References

1949 births
Living people
Swedish male speed skaters
Speed skaters at the 1972 Winter Olympics
Speed skaters at the 1976 Winter Olympics
Olympic speed skaters of Sweden
20th-century Swedish people